The Wəlastəkwewiyik, or Maliseet (also spelled Malecite), are an Algonquian-speaking First Nation of the Wabanaki Confederacy. They are the indigenous people of the Wolastoq (Saint John River) valley and its tributaries. Their territory extends across the current borders of New Brunswick and Quebec in Canada, and parts of Maine in the United States. 

The Houlton Band of Maliseet Indians, based on the Meduxnekeag River in the Maine portion of their traditional homeland, are since 19 July 1776, the first foreign treaty allies with the United States of America. They are a federally recognized tribe of Maliseet people. Today Maliseet people have also migrated to other parts of the world. The Maliseet have occupied areas of forest, river and coastal areas within their 20,000,000-acre, 200-mile wide, and 600-mile long homeland in the Saint John river watershed.

Name
The people call themselves Wəlastəkwewiyik Wəlastəkw means "bright river" or "shining river" ("wəl-" = good, "-as-" shining, "-təkw" = river; "-iyik" = people of). Wəlastəkwiyik therefore simply means "People of the Bright River" in their native language. The Maliseet (Malecite) have long been associated with the Saint John River. Their territory still extends as far as the Saint Lawrence River. Their lands and resources are bounded on the east by the Miꞌkmaq people, on the west by the Penobscot, and on the south by the Passamaquoddy, who also still speak related Algonquian languages.

Malesse'jik was a Miꞌkmaq word believed to mean "He speaks slowly," or differently, by which the Miꞌkmaq people contrasted the other tribe's language to their own. The meaning of the word today is unknown but it is commonly mistranslated to "he speaks badly, lazy, or broken".  This term is the exonym by which the Miꞌkmaq people referred to this group when speaking to early Europeans. The Europeans met the Miꞌkmaq people before the Wəlastəkwewiyik, and transliterated Malesse'jik to Malécite in French for this people, not understanding that it was not their true name. The later English colonists anglicized this term as Maliseet, in another transliteration of sound in their own language.

In 1758, an appellation which then becomes more and more frequent and observed in both French and English are the terminologies "Marichites" in French and in English "Maricheets.".

Maliseet Communities
 Maine, United States
 Houlton Band of Maliseet Indians (Metaksonekiyak Wolastoqewiyik)
 New Brunswick, Canada
 Kingsclear First Nation (Bilijk Wəlastəkwewiyik)
 Madawaska Maliseet First Nation (Matowesekok Wəlastəkwewiyik)
 Oromocto First Nation (Welamoktuk) 
 St. Mary's First Nation (Sitansisk Wolastoqiyik)
 Tobique First Nation (Wolastoqiyik Neqotkuk)
 Woodstock First Nation (Wetstak)
 Quebec, Canada
 Wolastoqiyik Wahsipekuk (Viger) First Nation (Wahsipekuk)

History

17th century
At the time of European encounter, the Wəlastəkwewiyik were living in walled villages and practicing horticulture (corn, beans, squash and tobacco). In addition to cultivating and growing crops, the women gathered and processed fruits, berries, nuts and natural produce. The men contributed by fishing and hunting, and the women cooked these finds. Written accounts in the early 17th century, such as those of Samuel de Champlain and Marc LesCarbot, refer to a large Malecite village at the mouth of the Saint John River. Later in the century, sources indicate their headquarters had shifted upriver to Meductic, on the middle reaches of the Saint John River.

The French explorers were the first to establish a fur trade with the Wəlastəkwewiyik, which became important in their territory.  Some European goods were desired because they were useful to Wəlastəkwewiyik subsistence and culture.  The French Jesuits also established missions, where some Wəlastəkwewiyik converted to Catholicism. After years of colonialism, many learned the French language. The French called them Malécite, a transliteration of the Mi'kmaq name for the people.

Local histories depict many encounters with the Iroquois, five powerful nations based south and east of the Great Lakes, and the Innu located to the north. Contact with European fisher-traders in the early 17th century and with specialized fur traders developed into a stable relationship which lasted for nearly 100 years. Despite devastating population losses to European infectious diseases, to which they had no immunity, these Atlantic First Nations held on to their traditional coastal or river locations for hunting, fishing and gathering. They lived along river valleys for trapping.

Colonial wars 

As both the French and English increased the number of their settlers in North America, their competition grew for control of the fur trade and physical territory. In addition, wars were carried out that reflected war in Europe. The lucrative eastern fur trade faltered with the general unrest, as French and English hostilities concentrated in the region between Québec and Port-Royal. Increasing sporadic fighting and raiding also took place on the lower Saint John River.

In this period, Malecite women took over a larger share of the economic burden and began to farm, raising crops which previously had been grown only south of Malecite territory. Men continued to hunt, though with limited success. They became useful allies to the French as support against the English. For a short period during the late 17th and early 18th centuries, Malecite warriors were engaged frequently in armed conflict, becoming virtually a military organization.

18th century 
With the gradual cessation of hostilities in the first quarter of the 18th century, and with the beaver supply severely diminished, fur trading declined. There was little possibility for the Maliseet to return to their traditional ways of life. Their style of seasonal, shifting agriculture on the river was curtailed by the encroachment of European settlers. All the while, the land was becoming well known to wealthy elites, who took advantage of the quality hunting and sport-fishing spots scattered throughout the province. They took all the farmland along the Saint John River, which was previously occupied by the Maliseet, displacing many Aboriginal people from more than a million and a half acres of prime land.

19th century
The Maliseet practised some traditional crafts as late as the 19th century, especially building wigwams and birchbark canoes. They had made changes during the previous two centuries while acquiring European metal cutting tools and containers, muskets and alcohol, foods and clothing. In making wood, bark or basketry items, or in guiding, trapping and hunting, the Maliseet identified as engaging in "Indian work."

The Europeans developed potato farming in Maine and New Brunswick, which created a new market and demand for Maliseet baskets and containers. Other Maliseet worked in pulp mills, construction, nursing, teaching and business. With evidence that many Maliseet suffered widespread hunger and were wandering, government officials established the first Indian reserves at The Brothers, Oromocto, Fredericton, Kingsclear, Woodstock, Tobique, Madawaska (pre-1800s), and Cacouna.

Silas Tertius Rand was a linguist missionary who translated some Bible Selections into Maliseet which were published in 1863 and then the Gospel of John in 1870.

20th century
The Maliseet of New Brunswick struggled with problems of unemployment and poverty common to Indigenous people elsewhere in Canada, but they have evolved a sophisticated system of decision making and resource allocation. They support community enterprises in economic development, scouting and sports. Some are successful in middle and higher education and have important trade and professional standings; individuals and families are prominent in Indigenous and women's rights; and others serve in provincial and federal native organizations, in government and in community development. There were 4,659 registered Maliseet in 1996.

Culture
The customs and language of the Maliseet are very similar to those of the neighbouring Passamaquoddy (Peskotomuhkati). They are also close to those of the Algonquian-speaking Miꞌkmaq and Penobscot peoples.

The Wəlastəkwewiyik differed from the Miꞌkmaq by pursuing a partial agrarian economy. They also overlapped territory with neighbouring peoples. The Wəlastəkwewiyik and Passamaquoddy languages are similar enough that linguists consider them slightly different dialects of the same language. Typically they are not differentiated for study.

Two traditional Maliseet songs, a dance song and a love song, were collected by Natalie Curtis and published in 1907.
As transcribed by Curtis, the love song demonstrates a meter cycle of seven bars and switches between major and minor tonality.

Many other songs were recorded by anthropologist William H. Mechling, whose wax cylinder recordings of Maliseet songs are held by the Canadian Museum of History. Many of these songs were lost to the community, as the pressures to assimilate into mainstream Canadian culture led the Maliseet people to stop passing their songs on to youth; in the 2010s, however, Maliseet musician Jeremy Dutcher undertook a project of listening to the wax cylinder recordings and reviving the songs. His album Wolastoqiyik Lintuwakonawa was released in 2018, and won the 2018 Polaris Music Prize.

Ethnobotany
The Maliseet use Abies balsamea for a variety of uses. They use the juice of the plant as a laxative, use the pitch in medicines, and use an infusion of the bark, sometimes mixed spruce and tamarack bark for gonorrhea.
 They use the needles and branches as pillows and bedding, the roots as thread, and use the pitch to waterproof seams in canoes.

Current situation

Today, within New Brunswick, there are approximately 7,700 Maliseet with status in the Madawaska, Tobique, Woodstock, Kingsclear, Saint Mary's and Oromocto First Nations. There are also 1700 in the Houlton Band in Maine, and 1200 in the Viger First Nation in Quebec. The Brothers is a reserve made up of two islands in the Kennebecasis River; they are uninhabited but available for hunting and fishing.

About 650 native speakers of Maliseet remain, and about 500 of Passamaquoddy, living on both sides of the border between New Brunswick and Maine.  Most are older, although some young people have begun studying and preserving the language.  An active program of scholarship on the Maliseet-Passamaquoddy language takes place at the Mi'kmaq - Maliseet Institute at the University of New Brunswick, in collaboration with the native speakers.  David Francis Sr., a Passamaquoddy elder living in Sipayik, Maine, has been an important resource for the program.  The Institute has the goal of helping Native American students master their native languages. The linguist Philip LeSourd has done extensive research on the language.

The Houlton Band of Maliseet was invited to take a nonvoting seat in the Maine Legislature, starting with the 126th Legislature in 2013. Henry John Bear, a treaty rights educator, tribal lawyer, fisherman and forester, was elected by his people to this seat.

There have been centuries of intermarriage between the Maliseet and European colonists and settlers. Surnames associated with Maliseet ancestry include: Denis, Sabattis, Gabriel, Saulis, Atwin, Launière, Athanase, Nicholas, Brière, Bear, Ginnish, Solis, Vaillancourt, Wallace, Paul, Polchies, Tomah, Sappier, Perley, Aubin, Francis, Sacobie, Nash, Meuse.  Also included are DeVoe, DesVaux, DeVou, DeVost, DeVot, DeVeau.

Notable Maliseet
Gabriel Acquin was the founder of the Reserve created in 1867, which is now part of St. Mary's First Nation.
Sarah Anala, social worker, awardee of the Order of Canada and the Queen Elizabeth II Diamond Jubilee Medal
Noel Bear, active during the “Aroostook War” of (1838–39)
Noël Bernard, Malecite leader; fl. 1781–1801
Jeremy Dutcher, musician, winner of the 2018 Polaris Music Prize for his album Wolastoqiyik Lintuwakonawa
Shayne Michael, poet
Graydon Nicholas was the Lieutenant Governor of New Brunswick, Canada, from 2009 to 2014. In this Viceregal position he acted as the Queen's representative in the province.
Sandra Lovelace Nicholas, a Maliseet activist, is known for challenging discriminatory provisions of the Indian Act in Canada, which deprived Aboriginal or Indigenous women of their status when they married non-Aboriginals.  It imposed a patriarchal idea of descent and identity on peoples who traditionally had matrilineal kinship systems, whereby children belonged to the mother's people and took their social status from her family.  Nicholas was instrumental in bringing the case before the United Nations Human Rights Commission and lobbying for the 1985 legislation which reinstated some rights of First Nation women and their children in Canada via Bill C31 (1985). Retaining Aboriginal status for future generations is still an issue for Maliseet and all Aboriginal groups. Nicholas was appointed to the Senate of Canada on September 21, 2005
Peter Lewis Paul was a Maliseet oral historian (1902-1989) who lived on the Woodstock Reserve (N.B.) on the Saint John River. He shared information with numerous academic linguists, ethnohistorians, and anthropologists. The recipient of many honours, he was awarded a Centennial Medal in 1969, received an honorary Doctor of Law degree from the University of New Brunswick, and the Order of Canada in 1987.
David Slagger represented the Maliseet people to the Maine House of Representatives

See also 
Algonquian peoples

References

Maps
Maps showing the approximate locations of areas occupied by members of the Wabanaki Confederacy (from north to south):

External links

Maliseet language and culture links
https://www.nytimes.com/1970/10/11/archives/indians-to-open-school-in-maine-us-funds-aid-experimental-center.html.-from state schools to job corps to tribal recognition. The history of wabanaki micmac maliseet education included a discussion of wabanaki tribes and land issues . the schools lead to band recognition in maine I.e job corps or related programs in maine 

Mi'kmaq-Maliseet Institute, University of New Brunswick
Passamaquoddy-Maliseet Language Portal

 
Algonquian peoples
Indigenous peoples of the Northeastern Woodlands
Native American history of Maine
Wabanaki Confederacy
Native American tribes in Maine
First Nations in Atlantic Canada
First Nations in Quebec
Ethnic groups in New Brunswick
North Maine Woods
Algonquian ethnonyms